The Amsterdam studio of the prolific Dutch Golden Age painter Rembrandt included numerous younger pupils/assistants. Among his many pupils were:
 Beijeren, Leendert van (1619-1649)(RKD)
 Bol, Ferdinand (1616-1680), (AH)(RKD)
 Borssom, Anthonie van (1631-1677)(RKD)
 Brouwer, Cornelis (d1681), (AH)(RKD)
 Dijck, Abraham van (1635-1680)(RKD)
 Doomer, Lambert (1624-1700)(RKD)
 Dorsten, Jacob van (1627-1674)(RKD)
 Dou, Gerard (1613-1675), (AH)(RKD)
 Drost, Willem (1633-1659), (AH)(RKD)
 Dullaert, Heyman (1636-1684), (AH)(RKD)
 Eeckhout, Gerbrand van den (1621-1674), (AH)(RKD)
 Fabritius, Carel (1622-1654), (AH)(RKD)
 Flinck, Govert (1615-1660), (AH)(RKD)
 Furnerius, Abraham (1628-1654)(RKD)
 Gelder, Aert de (1645-1727), (AH)(RKD)
 Gherwen, Reynier van (1620-1662)(RKD)
 Glabbeeck, Jan van (1630-1687)(RKD)
 Heerschop, Hendrick (1626 - 1690)
 Hoogstraten, Samuel van (1627-1678), (AH)(RKD)
 Horst, Gerrit Willemsz. (1612-1652), (RKD)
 Jansen, Heinrich (1625-1667)(RKD)
 Jouderville, Isaac de (1612-1646)(RKD)
 Keil, Bernhard (1624-1687), (AH)(RKD)
 Kneller, Gottfried (Sir) (1646-1723), (AH)(RKD)
 Koninck, Philips (1619-1688), (AH)(RKD)
 Leveck, Jacobus (1634-1675), (AH)(RKD)
 Maes, Nicolaes (1634-1693), (AH)(RKD)
 Mayr, Johann Ulrich (1629-1704)(RKD)
 Ovens, Jürgen (1623-1678), (AH)(RKD)
 Paudiss, Christoph (1630-1666), (AH)(RKD)
 Pluym, Karel van der (1625-1672)(RKD)
 Poorter, Willem de (1608-1649), (AH)(RKD)
 Raven, Johannes (II) (1633-1662)(RKD)
 Renesse, Constantijn à (1626-1680)(RKD)
 Rijn, Titus Rembrandtsz. van (1641-1668), (AH)(RKD)
 Rousseaux, Jacques des (1600-1638)(RKD)
 Verdoel, Adriaen (I) (1620-1675), (AH)(RKD)
 Victors, Jan (1619-1676)(RKD)
 Vliet, Jan Gillisz. van (1605-1668)(RKD)
 Wulfhagen, Franz (1624-1670), (AH)(RKD)

See also
 List of Rembrandt connoisseurs and scholars

References
See Rembrandt article

Rembrandt